The Sopwith Baby is a British single-seat floatplane that was operated by the Royal Naval Air Service (RNAS) from 1915.

Development and design
The Baby (also known as the Admiralty 8200 Type) was a development of the two-seat Sopwith Schneider. The Baby utilized a wooden structure with fabric covering. A Lewis Gun was fitted, either above the fuselage firing through the propeller arc without the benefit of synchronization, or over the top wing, firing above it. To meet the more demanding conditions of 1916–18, Further modifications were made on aircraft built by Blackburn Aircraft at Leeds, United Kingdom. A modified variant of the Baby, the Fairey Hamble Baby was built by Fairey and Parnall.

The Royal Naval Air Service ordered 286 Sopwith Babies of which 100 were built by Sopwith at Kingston and 186 by Blackburn Aircraft at Leeds with others for export. License manufacture was also undertaken in Italy by SA Aeronautica Gio Ansaldo of Turin, who built 100 examples for the Italian Aviazione della Regia Marina.

Operational history
The Baby was used as a shipborne reconnaissance and bomber aircraft operating from seaplane carriers and cruisers, as well as naval trawlers and minelayers.  Many Babies were attached to RNAS coastal air stations located in England and Scotland and RNAS stations in Egypt, Greece and Italy.

A major role of the Baby was to warn of German Zeppelin raids as far from Britain as possible, along with tracking German naval movements.

Babies also saw service with the navies of the United States, France, Chile, Greece and Norway. In Norway additional Babies were built as replacements, with some seeing service until 1930. Two of the 10 Sopwith Baby floatplanes that were acquired by the Royal Norwegian Navy Air Service were brought to Svalbard in the summer of 1928 to participate in the search for the lost Norwegian polar explorer Roald Amundsen, but were not used for the search.

Surviving aircraft

The original components of two Babies built by Sopwith, Nos. 8214 and 8215, have been utilized to complete a composite aircraft for display at the Fleet Air Arm Museum at RNAS Yeovilton, Somerset.  The exhibit has been marked with the serial N-2078, which was a Blackburn-built aircraft, and has been named Jabberwock.

Operators

Royal Australian Navy operated 1 example (with a Royal Naval Air Service crew) in 1917 from cruiser HMAS Brisbane.

Chilean Navy operated 3 examples from 1919–1923

French Navy operated 33 examples from 1916–1919

Hellenic Navy operated 19 from 1918–1919

Aviazione della Regia Marina 102 examples from 1917–1923 (including 2 trials aircraft from the UK)

Imperial Japanese Navy Air Service operated 1 example from 1916

Dutch Naval Aviation Service 1 example from 1916–1919 An RNAS aircraft force landed forty miles off the Dutch coast and was towed in and interned.

Royal Norwegian Navy Air Service operated 10 examples from 1917–1931 

Royal Naval Air Service

Royal Air Force
No. 219 Squadron RAF
No. 229 Squadron RAF
No. 246 Squadron RAF
No. 248 Squadron RAF
No. 249 Squadron RAF
No. 263 Squadron RAF
No. 269 Squadron RAF
No. 270 Squadron RAF

United States Navy

Specifications

See also

References

Notes

Footnotes

Bibliography

 
 
 
 

 
 
 

1910s British military reconnaissance aircraft
1910s British bomber aircraft
1920s Norwegian fighter aircraft
Floatplanes
Rotary-engined aircraft
Biplanes
Single-engined tractor aircraft
Baby
Aircraft first flown in 1915